László Papp (4 January 1905 in Szentes – 28 January 1989 in Budapest) was a Hungarian wrestler who competed in the 1928 Summer Olympics.

References

External links
 

1905 births
1989 deaths
People from Szentes
Olympic wrestlers of Hungary
Wrestlers at the 1928 Summer Olympics
Hungarian male sport wrestlers
Olympic silver medalists for Hungary
Olympic medalists in wrestling
Medalists at the 1928 Summer Olympics
Sportspeople from Csongrád-Csanád County
20th-century Hungarian people